Lodelinsart is a town of Wallonia and a district of the municipality of Charleroi, located in the province of Hainaut, Belgium.  

It was a municipality of its own before the fusion of the Belgian municipalities in 1977.

Folkrore 
The Royal Climbia's Club is a philanthropic club founded in 1893 in Lodelinsart. The club is made up of thirteen local men and many volunteers who work with them for charity. The Climbia's organise a masked ball and various festive events. The Royal Cimbia's club is part of the oral and intangible heritage of the Brussels-Wallonia Federation.

Crime 
Sadia Sheikh was murdered in Lodelinsart in 2007.

References

Sub-municipalities of Charleroi
Former municipalities of Hainaut (province)